UAE National Day (Al Yawm Al Watani") is celebrated on 2 December each year in the United Arab Emirates. The seventh emirate, Ras al Khaimah, was added to the federation on 10 February 1972 making it the last emirate (state) to join.

History
The UAE National Day stands for the nationalisation of the British Protectorate Treaties, which were declared in 1968, and also falls on the anniversary of the federal unification of the six emirates (seven in 1972 after Ras Al Khaimah joined) in 1971 which combined to form the modern-day country, headed by Sheikh Zayed bin Sultan Al Nahyan, the federation's first president. Recently, the UAE National Day has been combined with the Emirati Martyr's day that is on November 30th.

Celebration
Grand celebrations are held across the country to mark the event. Fireworks, car rallies and dance shows are the most common activities. Over 57% of UAE residents anticipate seeing fireworks during the UAE National Day weekend. People will usually dress up in UAE national flag colors and decorate their homes, workplaces, cars and streets to celebrate the day. Palm trees are decorated with lights from the colors of the flag. Hotels and other public sites are decorated with flags and lights. Some UAE residents also organize some sporting challenge to celebrate it 

Downtown Dubai is lightened with fireworks while the Burj Khalifa displays the UAE flag. It is crowded with people seeking to see the massive national day fireworks and celebration. Shopping centers, malls, and institutions are decorated with the flag.

Heritage Villages are set all over the UAE in order to celebrate this event traditionally. Holidays are given from the National Day until two days later. Air shows are conducted while military processions are held at Abu Dhabi National Exhibition Centre for the rulers of the Emirates, members of the Federal National Council, and Emirati citizens.

See also
Public holidays in the United Arab Emirates

References

External links
 
 UAE National Day
 UAE National Day & Flag
UAE National Day Offers
50th UAE National Day 2021

1971 establishments in the United Arab Emirates
Recurring events established in 1971
National days
December observances
Emirati nationalism
Public holidays in the United Arab Emirates
Winter events in the United Arab Emirates